"Le goût du pain" is a world music song performed by Belgian singer Natacha Atlas. It was written by Didier Golemanas and Kamel El Habchi, and produced by El Habchi and Transglobal Underground. The song appears on the French version of Atlas' album Ayeshteni (2001). In 2001, the track was released as a promotional single in France to promote Atlas' performance at the Paris Olympia on 2 November.

Formats and track listings
These are the formats and track listings of major single releases of "Le Goût Du Pain".
 
CD single
(VISA #6671)
 "Le goût du pain" (Radio edit)

Personnel
The following people contributed to "Le Goût du Pain":

Natacha Atlas – lead vocals
Kamel El Habchi, Transglobal Underground – production
André Manoukian – mixing

References

External links
Official website

2001 singles
French-language songs
Electronic songs
Natacha Atlas songs
World music songs
2001 songs